Athanase Seromba (born 1963) is a Catholic priest from Rwanda who was found guilty of committing genocide and of crimes against humanity during the Rwandan genocide.

Crimes 
At the time of the genocide, Seromba was the priest in charge of a Catholic parish at Nyange in the Kibuye province of western Rwanda.  He was convicted of committing genocide due to his providing of key and necessary approval for the bulldozing of his church, where 1,500-2,000 Tutsis were taking refuge, with the intent to not only kill large numbers of people, but specifically to destroy the Tutsis as an ethnic group. 

Seromba fled Rwanda in July 1994. Catholic monks helped him move to Italy, change his name and also helped him work as a priest for the Catholic Church near the city of Florence using the alias Anastasio Sumba Bura. Under pressure from Carla Del Ponte, the then Chief UN War Crimes Prosecutor, Seromba surrendered himself to the International Criminal Tribunal for Rwanda (ICTR) on February 6, 2002. On February 8, 2002, he pleaded not guilty to the charges of genocide, complicity in genocide, conspiracy to commit genocide and extermination as a crime against humanity.  His trial began on September 20, 2004, before the Third Trial Chamber of the ICTR.  On 13 December 2006, he was found guilty and sentenced to 15 years in prison.

Seromba appealed the verdict. On 12 March 2008, the Appeals Chamber of the International Criminal Tribunal for Rwanda (ICTR) decided his responsibility was even greater than previously found, affirmed his conviction, and increased his punishment to life in prison.

On 27 June 2009, Seromba was transferred to Benin. Seromba is serving his life sentence at Akpro-Missérété prison at Porto-Novo, Benin.

See also
Emmanuel Rukundo
Wenceslas Munyeshyaka
Grégoire Ndahimana
Elizaphan Ntakirutimana
Rwandan genocide

Notes and references

External links
Fondation Hirondelle
Trial Watch - Athanase Seromba
ICTR documents on the case

1963 births
Living people
Hutu people
20th-century Rwandan Roman Catholic priests
Catholic priests convicted of crimes against humanity
People convicted by the International Criminal Tribunal for Rwanda
Prisoners sentenced to life imprisonment by international courts and tribunals
Rwandan people convicted of crimes against humanity
Rwandan people convicted of genocide
Rwandan prisoners sentenced to life imprisonment